Amalka may refer to:

Amalka (given name), a girl's name, a variant of Amalia
Víla Amálka - Fairy Amalka, a popular Czech animated fairy tale
Amalka, Poland, a village in Poland
Amalka Supercomputing facility, a supercomputer in the Czech Republic